Kopčany ( or) is a village in western Slovakia, near the border with the Czech Republic.

History
The oldest historical records to mention Kopčany date from 1392. However, the village is much older. In the 9th century, Kopčany was part of the agglomeration of Mikulčice, an important center and possibly the capital of Great Moravia.

Kopčany is also the site of one of the oldest standing buildings for which a Great Moravian origin is postulated, the Church of St Margaret of Antioch.

The father of Tomáš Garrigue Masaryk, the first President of Czechoslovakia, came from Kopčany. There is a claim that Masaryk himself was born here.

The fighter pilot Izidor Kovárik (1922–44) was born in Kopčany. He was a high-scoring SVZ flying ace who fought on the Eastern Front.

Geography
It is part of the Skalica District in the Trnava Region.

Demographics
Kopčany has a population of about 2,584 people.

See also
 List of municipalities and towns in Slovakia

References

Genealogical resources
The records for genealogical research are available at the state archive "Statny Archiv in Bratislava, Slovakia"

 Roman Catholic church records (births/marriages/deaths): 1678–1910 (parish A)
 Lutheran church records (births/marriages/deaths): 1786–1895 (parish B)

External links

Official website 
Surnames of living people in Kopcany

Great Moravia
Villages and municipalities in Skalica District